The 1934 Gonzaga Bulldogs football team was an American football team that represented Gonzaga University during the 1934 college football season. In their fourth year under head coach Mike Pecarovich, the Bulldogs compiled an 8–2–1 record, shut out six of their 11 opponents, and outscored all opponents by a total of 180 to 71. The team's victories included three against Pacific Coast Conference teams. The team's only losses were to Oregon and San Francisco.

The team was led by triple-threat halfback Ike Petersen who was one of the leading scorers in college football during the 1934 season. Petersen went on to play in the National Football League for the Chicago Cardinals in 1935 and the Detroit Lions in 1936.

Schedule

References

Gonzaga
Gonzaga Bulldogs football seasons
Gonzaga Bulldogs football